Lucian Popescu (12 January 1912, in Bucharest – 9 December 1982) was a Romanian boxer who won European titles in three different classes.

Nicknamed Chocolate Boy ("băiatul de ciocolată"), he is considered to be the best Romanian boxer between the two world wars.

Making his amateur debut on 23 December 1927, he became national champion in the flyweight class in 1928. When he was 17, he decided to turn pro and won his first match against a German boxer.
 
On 7 June 1930, in Bucharest, he challenged flyweight European title holder Kid Oliva, a Frenchman. Having Umberto Lancia as his cornerman, Popescu won his first European belt. Later, he would win two more European belts in 1931 in the bantamweight class (cornermen Constantin Nour and Marcu Spankow), and in 1939 in the featherweight class.

After he retired as a boxer he became a trainer at the "Progresul" boxing club in Bucharest, where he had among his disciples European amateur champions Gheorghe Negrea and Aurel Dumitrescu.

He died on 9 December 1982.

Professional boxing record

|-
|align="center" colspan=8|49 Wins (13 knockouts, 36 decisions), 13 Losses (4 knockouts, 9 decisions), 13 Draws, 1 No contest
|-
| align="center" style="border-style: none none solid solid; background: #e3e3e3"|Result
| align="center" style="border-style: none none solid solid; background: #e3e3e3"|Record
| align="center" style="border-style: none none solid solid; background: #e3e3e3"|Opponent
| align="center" style="border-style: none none solid solid; background: #e3e3e3"|Type
| align="center" style="border-style: none none solid solid; background: #e3e3e3"|Round
| align="center" style="border-style: none none solid solid; background: #e3e3e3"|Date
| align="center" style="border-style: none none solid solid; background: #e3e3e3"|Location
| align="center" style="border-style: none none solid solid; background: #e3e3e3"|Notes
|-
|Loss
|
|align=left| Petre Brătescu
|RTD
| 
|1945-07-15	
|align=left| Romania
|align=left|
|-
|Draw
|
|align=left| Petre Brătescu
|PTS
| 
|1945-04-28	
|align=left| Romania
|align=left|
|-
|Win
|
|align=left| Gheorghe Popescu
|PTS
| 
|1945-04-15	
|align=left| Romania
|align=left|
|-
|Win
|
|align=left| Ion Sandu
|PTS
|12 
|1943-08-09	
|align=left| Bucharest, Romania
|align=left|
|-
|Loss
|
|align=left| Gino Bondavalli
|PTS
|15 
|1942-05-31	
|align=left| Reggio Emilia, Italy
|align=left|
|-
|Draw
|
|align=left| Constantin David
|PTS
|12 
|1942-04-26	
|align=left| Romania
|align=left|
|-
|Loss
|
|align=left| Constantin David
|PTS
|10 
|1942-03-08	
|align=left| Romania
|align=left|
|-
|Loss
|
|align=left| Ernst Weiss
|PTS
|15 
|1941-05-30	
|align=left| Engelmann Arena, Vienna, Austria
|align=left|
|-
|Win
|
|align=left| Ion Sandu
|PTS
|10 
|1941-05-24	
|align=left| Bucharest, Romania
|align=left|
|-
|Win
|
|align=left| Stefan Eisenreich
|PTS
|10 
|1940-10-05	
|align=left| Belgrade, Serbia
|align=left|
|-
|Win
|
|align=left| Gino Cattaneo
|PTS
|10 
|1939-07-01	
|align=left| Bucharest, Romania
|align=left|
|-
|Win
|
|align=left| Phil Dolhem
|PTS
|15 
|1939-06-03	
|align=left| Arenel Romane, Bucharest, Romania
|align=left|
|-
|Win
|
|align=left| Tommy Carr
|PTS
|8 
|1938-01-27	
|align=left| Eldorado Stadium, Edinburgh-Leith, United Kingdom
|align=left|
|-
|Loss
|
|align=left| Housine Caid
|PTS
|10 
|1938-12-08	
|align=left| Salle Wagram, Paris, France
|align=left|
|-
|Draw
|
|align=left| Gheorghe Popescu
|PTS
|10 
|1938-07-16	
|align=left| Bucharest, Romania
|align=left|
|-
|Draw
|
|align=left| Rene Taysse
|PTS
|10 
|1938-01-07	
|align=left| Élysée Montmartre, Paris, France
|align=left|
|-
|Win
|
|align=left| Vasile Stoian
|PTS
| 
|1938-01-01	
|align=left| Romania
|align=left|
|-
|Draw
|
|align=left| Pachi Martinez
|PTS
| 
|1937-10-22	
|align=left|
|align=left|
|-
|Draw
|
|align=left| Gheorghe Popescu
|PTS
| 
|1936-09-04	
|align=left| Romania
|align=left|
|-
|-align="center"
|style="background:#ddd;"|NC
|
|align=left| Vince Dell'Orto
|NC
|
|1936-07-26	
|align=left| Bucharest, Romania
|align=left|
|-
|Win
|
|align=left| Ion Mihail
|KO
|3 
|1936-06-06	
|align=left| Bucharest, Romania
|align=left|
|-
|Loss
|
|align=left| Achille Wimme
|PTS
|10 
|1935-05-25	
|align=left| Arenele Romane, Bucharest, Romania
|align=left|
|-
|Loss
|
|align=left| Aurel Toma
|PTS
|10 
|1935-05-15	
|align=left| Arenele Romane, Bucharest, Romania
|align=left|
|-
|Win
|
|align=left| Gheorghe Popescu
|PTS
|10 
|1934-08-23	
|align=left| Ploiești, Romania
|align=left|
|-
|Win
|
|align=left| Mielu Marinescu
|PTS
|10 
|1934-07-21	
|align=left| Arenele Romane, Bucharest, Romania
|align=left|
|-
|Win
|
|align=left| Traian Dumitrescu
|PTS
|10 
|1934-07-18	
|align=left| Stadion Dragoș Vodă, Bucharest, Romania
|align=left|
|-
|Loss
|
|align=left| Jose Girones
|KO
|7 
|1933-11-22	
|align=left| Teatro Circo Olympia, Barcelona, Spain
|align=left|
|-
|Win
|
|align=left| Richard Stegemann
|PTS
|10 
|1933-09-01	
|align=left| Arenele Romane, Bucharest, Romania
|align=left|
|-
|Win
|
|align=left| Gheorghe Stamate
|PTS
|10 
|1933-06-24	
|align=left| Arenele Romane, Bucharest, Romania
|align=left|
|-
|Win
|
|align=left| Wilhelm Bartneck
|PTS
|10 
|1933-05-09	
|align=left| Arenele Romane, Bucharest, Romania
|align=left|
|-
|Win
|
|align=left| Mihail Covaci
|RTD
|10 
|1933-03-31	
|align=left| Bucharest, Romania
|align=left|
|-
|Loss
|
|align=left| Nicolas Petit-Biquet
|PTS
|10 
|1933-02-25	
|align=left| Palais des Sports, Brussels, Belgium
|align=left|
|-
|Loss
|
|align=left| Guy Bonaugure
|PTS
|10 
|1933-01-07	
|align=left| Paris-Ring, Paris, France
|align=left|
|-
|Draw
|
|align=left| Hans Schiller
|PTS
|10 
|1932-11-18	
|align=left| Bucharest, Romania
|align=left|
|-
|Draw
|
|align=left| Nelu Oprescu
|PTS
|10 
|1932-09-24	
|align=left| Arenele Romane, Bucharest, Romania
|align=left|
|-
|Win
|
|align=left| Josef Pospischil
|KO
|5 
|1932-07-30	
|align=left| Bucharest, Romania
|align=left|
|-
|Win
|
|align=left| Gheorghe Stamate
|RTD
|7 
|1932-07-23	
|align=left| Arenele Romane, Bucharest, Romania
|align=left|
|-
|Draw
|
|align=left| Johnny Alphonse Edwards
|PTS
|10 
|1932-06-19	
|align=left| Bucharest, Romania
|align=left|
|-
|Win
|
|align=left| Marin Plaeșu
|PTS
|10 
|1932-06-04	
|align=left| Arenele Romane, Bucharest, Romania
|align=left|
|-
|Win
|
|align=left| Georg Pfitzner
|KO
|2 
|1932-05-21	
|align=left| Arenele Romane, Bucharest, Romania
|align=left|
|-
|Draw
|
|align=left| Mielu Doculescu
|PTS
|10 
|1932-05-11	
|align=left| Bucharest, Romania
|align=left|
|-
|Win
|
|align=left| Mielu Doculescu
|PTS
|10 
|1932-04-24	
|align=left| Arenele Romane, Bucharest, Romania
|align=left|
|-
|Loss
|
|align=left| Domenico Bernasconi
|KO
|5 
|1932-03-19	
|align=left| Milan, Italy
|align=left|
|-
|Loss
|
|align=left| Eugène Huat
|RTD
|5 
|1932-02-08	
|align=left| Palais des Sports, Paris, France
|align=left|
|-
|Win
|
|align=left| Gheorghe Stamate
|PTS
| 
|1932-01-07	
|align=left| Romania
|align=left|
|-
|Win
|
|align=left| Julien Pannecoucke
|KO
|4 
|1931-12-21	
|align=left| Palais des Sports, Paris, France
|align=left|
|-
|Win
|
|align=left| Carlos Flix
|PTS
|15 
|1931-09-19	
|align=left| Arenele Romane, Bucharest, Romania
|align=left|
|-
|Win
|
|align=left| Gheorghe Stamate
|PTS
|10 
|1931-08-29	
|align=left| Arenele Romane, Bucharest, Romania
|align=left|
|-
|Win
|
|align=left| Emile Degand
|PTS
|10 
|1931-07-11	
|align=left| Arenele Romane, Bucharest, Romania
|align=left|
|-
|Win
|
|align=left| Nicolas Petit-Biquet
|PTS
|10 
|1931-06-06	
|align=left| Arenele Romane, Bucharest, Romania
|align=left|
|-
|Win
|
|align=left| Georg Pfitzner
|KO
|2 
|1931-05-21	
|align=left| Bucharest, Romania
|align=left|
|-
|Loss
|
|align=left| Jackie Brown
|PTS
|15 
|1931-05-04	
|align=left| Kings Hall, Manchester, United Kingdom
|align=left|
|-
|Win
|
|align=left| Francois Biron
|PTS
|10 
|1931-04-13	
|align=left| Bucharest, Romania
|align=left|
|-
|Win
|
|align=left| Gheorghe Stamate
|RTD
|1 
|1931-02-14	
|align=left| Sidoli Circus, Bucharest, Romania
|align=left|
|-
|Win
|
|align=left| Carlo Cavagnoli
|PTS
|10 
|1930-11-15	
|align=left| Sidoli Circus, Bucharest, Romania
|align=left|
|-
|Win
|
|align=left| Valentin Angelmann
|PTS
|10 
|1930-10-18	
|align=left| Sidoli Circus, Bucharest, Romania
|align=left|
|-
|Win
|
|align=left| Rene Chalenge
|PTS
|15 
|1930-08-16	
|align=left| Arenele Romane, Bucharest, Romania
|align=left|
|-
|Win
|
|align=left| Kid Oliva
|RTD
|10 
|1930-06-07	
|align=left| Ramcomit Hall, Bucharest, Romania
|align=left|
|-
|Win
|
|align=left| Gheorghe Begheș
|KO
|2 
|1930-04-12	
|align=left| Sidoli Circus, Bucharest, Romania
|align=left|
|-
|Draw
|
|align=left| Gheorghe Stamate
|PTS
|10 
|1930-02-22	
|align=left| Bucharest, Romania
|align=left|
|-
|Loss
|
|align=left| Gheorghe Stamate
|PTS
|10 
|1929-12-14	
|align=left| Bucharest, Romania
|align=left|
|-
|Win
|
|align=left| Rene Gabes
|PTS
| 
|1929-11-17	
|align=left| Bucharest, Romania
|align=left|
|-
|Win
|
|align=left| Rene Chalange
|PTS
|10 
|1929-09-29	
|align=left| Sidoli Circus, Bucharest, Romania
|align=left|
|-
|Draw
|
|align=left| Rene Gabes
|PTS
|10 
|1929-08-10	
|align=left| Central Sporting Club, Paris, France
|align=left|
|-
|Draw
|
|align=left| Gheorghe Stamate
|PTS
|10 
|1929-08	
|align=left| Bucharest, Romania
|align=left|
|-
|Win
|
|align=left| Werner Hermansson
|PTS
|6 
|1929-05-09	
|align=left| Bucharest, Romania
|align=left|
|-
|Win
|
|align=left| Mielu Doculescu
|PTS
|3 
|1929-04-27	
|align=left| Bucharest, Romania
|align=left|
|-
|Win
|
|align=left| Mielu Doculescu
|PTS
|3 
|1929-02-08	
|align=left| Bucharest, Romania
|align=left|
|-
|Win
|
|align=left| Dumitru Ivan
|PTS
|3 
|1929-02-02	
|align=left| Bucharest, Romania
|align=left|
|-
|Win
|
|align=left| Mielu Doculescu
|PTS
|3 
|1928-12-15	
|align=left| Bucharest, Romania
|align=left|
|-
|Win
|
|align=left| Marin Plaeșu
|PTS
|3 
|1928-12-05	
|align=left| Romania
|align=left|
|-
|Win
|
|align=left| Gheoghe Gabor
|RTD
|3 
|1928-11-14	
|align=left| Bucharest, Romania
|align=left|
|-
|Win
|
|align=left| Nelu Oprescu
|RTD
|2 
|1928-05-09	
|align=left| Bucharest, Romania
|align=left|
|-
|Win
|
|align=left| Ion Bondac
|PTS
|6 
|1928-02-02	
|align=left| Bucharest, Romania
|align=left|
|-
|Win
|
|align=left| Dumitru Popa
|KO
|1 
|1928-01-13	
|align=left| Bucharest, Romania
|align=left|
|-
|Win
|
|align=left| Nelu Oprescu
|PTS
|6 
|1927-12-23	
|align=left| Bucharest, Romania
|align=left|
|}

Awards 
National Sport Award ("Premiul național al sporturilor")
Honored Trainer ("Antrenor emerit")

References 

1912 births
1982 deaths

Flyweight boxers
Bantamweight boxers
Featherweight boxers
European Boxing Union champions
Romanian boxing trainers
Sportspeople from Bucharest
Romanian male boxers